WIFL may refer to:

 World Indoor Football League, a league that was to begin in 1988 
 World Indoor Football League (2007), a league that played one season in 2007
 WIFL-LP, a low-power radio station (104.5 FM) licensed to serve Weirsdale, Florida, United States
 WXZC, a radio station (104.3 FM) licensed to serve Inglis, Florida, which held the call sign WIFL from 2000 to 2010

See also
WFL (disambiguation)
Wiffle (disambiguation)